Maroua (Fula: Marwa 𞤥𞤢𞤪𞤱𞤢) is the capital of the Far North Region of Cameroon, stretching along the banks of the Ferngo and Kaliao Rivers, in the foothills of the Mandara Mountains. The city had 301,371 inhabitants at the 2005 Census mainly Fulbe/Fulani ethnic group.

History 

The city was occupied by the Guiziga in the 17th century and the Mofu in the 18th century.

The Maroua Declaration, a maritime boundary agreement between Nigeria and Cameroon, was signed in Maroua on 1 June 1975.

Economy 
Embroidery, leather goods, jewelry, pottery are important economic activities in the city.

Transports 

The city also has the Maroua Salak Airport.

Education 

The University of Maroua is based in the city.

Places of worship    
Among the places of worship, they are predominantly Muslim mosques. There are also Christian churches and temples :  Roman Catholic Diocese of Maroua–Mokolo (Catholic Church), Evangelical Church of Cameroon (World Communion of Reformed Churches), Presbyterian Church in Cameroon (World Communion of Reformed Churches), Cameroon Baptist Convention (Baptist World Alliance), Full Gospel Mission Cameroon (Assemblies of God).

Climate 
The climate is Sahelian, being hot and dry for most of the year. 
Köppen-Geiger climate classification system classifies its climate as  hot semi-arid (BSh).

Sport 
Sports activities are recognized on football, traditional wrestling.

References

Populated places in Cameroon
Far North Region (Cameroon)
Provincial capitals in Cameroon